Kyle B. Nelson (born July 8, 1996) is an American professional baseball pitcher for the Arizona Diamondbacks of Major League Baseball (MLB). He has previously played in MLB for the Cleveland Indians.

Amateur career
Nelson attended Galileo Academy of Science and Technology in San Francisco, California, where he played football and baseball. He went undrafted in the 2014 Major League Baseball draft out of high school, and enrolled at the University of California, Santa Barbara where he played college baseball for the Santa Barbara Gauchos.

In 2015, Nelson's freshman year at UC Santa Barbara, he pitched to a 3-1 record and a 0.75 ERA, striking out 32 batters over 36 relief innings pitched, earning Freshman All-American honors. He played in the Northwoods League after the season. As a sophomore in 2016, he appeared in 33 games, going 7-2 with a 2.18 ERA, striking out 87 batters in 74 innings. He was named to the All-Big West First Team. In 2017, his junior season, he moved to the starting rotation. For the year, he made 15 starts, pitching to a 6-4 record and a 4.53 ERA over 87 innings.

Professional career

Cleveland Indians
Nelson was selected by the Cleveland Indians in the 15th round of the 2017 Major League Baseball draft.

After signing with Cleveland, Nelson made his professional debut with the Mahoning Valley Scrappers where he went 3-2 with a 2.48 ERA over 29 innings pitched in relief. In 2018, he began the season with the Lake County Captains where he was named a Midwest League All-Star before being promoted to the Lynchburg Hillcats in August. Over  innings pitched between the two clubs, he compiled a 6-1 record and a 1.58 ERA, striking out 67 and walking nine. Nelson began 2019 with Lynchburg before being promoted to the Akron RubberDucks in May where he earned Eastern League All-Star honors. In August, he was promoted to the Columbus Clippers, with whom he finished the year. Over 42 games with the three teams, he went 4-4 with a 2.28 ERA and 69 strikeouts over  innings.

The Indians selected Nelson's contract on September 9, 2020. In 2021, Nelson pitched  innings in relief for the Indians, giving up ten runs, striking out eight, and walking eight. While not with Cleveland, he pitched for the Clippers (now members of the Triple-A East) with whom he went 0-1 with a 6.66 ERA, twenty walks, and thirty strikeouts over  innings.

Nelson was designated for assignment by the newly-named Cleveland Guardians on November 19, 2021.

Arizona Diamondbacks
Nelson was claimed off waivers by the Arizona Diamondbacks on November 24, 2021, and recalled from Triple-A Reno on April 10, 2022.

References

External links

1996 births
Living people
Baseball players from San Francisco
Major League Baseball pitchers
Cleveland Indians players
Arizona Diamondbacks players
UC Santa Barbara Gauchos baseball players
Mahoning Valley Scrappers players
Lake County Captains players
Lynchburg Hillcats players
Akron RubberDucks players
Columbus Clippers players